Riding with the King was singer-songwriter John Hiatt's sixth album, released in 1983.  It was his second of three albums with Geffen Records.  Ron Nagle and Scott Mathews (credited as "Scott Matthews") produced side one of the album at The Pen in San Francisco, with Mathews himself playing all instruments (except guitar) and providing all the background vocals.  The second side of the album was produced by Nick Lowe at Eden Studios in London with a group of crack pub rock musicians backing Hiatt.

"I always kind of look at Riding with the King as the first album where I really put it altogether. I finally figured out what I was all about and found three or four styles I liked to work in", Hiatt observed about the album. Although the album failed to chart in the US, it received considerable critical acclaim with Robert Christgau observing "...this is his best album because the songs are so much his catchiest and pithiest. Most of them reflect smashed hopes."

The album's title track was taken from an odd dream Scott Mathews had, although he was never credited as a co-writer.  It was later covered by B.B. King and Eric Clapton on their album of the same name. Hiatt reworked the lyrics for the King and Clapton collaboration.

Track listing
All songs written by John Hiatt, except as indicated

Side one
"I Don't Even Try" – 3:25
"Death by Misadventure" (Hiatt, John Hadley) – 3:29 
"Girl on a String" – 3:11
"Lovers Will" – 4:00
"She Loves the Jerk" – 3:38
"Say It with Flowers" – 3:06

Side two
"Riding with the King" – 4:18
"You May Already Be a Winner" – 3:35
"Love Like Blood" – 3:55
"The Love that Harms" – 2:49
"Book Lovers" (Isabella Wood, Hiatt) – 3:04 
"Falling Up" – 3:35

Personnel
John Hiatt – vocals, guitar
 Scott Mathews – producer, drums, slide guitar, bass guitar, keyboards, saxophones, backing vocals (side one only)
 Nick Lowe – bass guitar, backing vocals (side two only)
 Martin Belmont – guitar (side two only)
 Paul Carrack – keyboards, backing vocals (side two only)
Bobby Irwin – drums (side two only)
Technical
Neill King – engineer
Brian Griffin – cover photography
Phil Smee – sleeve design

References

1983 albums
John Hiatt albums
Albums produced by Nick Lowe
Geffen Records albums